Gillingham railway station can refer to two railway stations in England:

Gillingham railway station (Kent)
Gillingham railway station (Dorset)